Brest Litovsk  Voivodeship (Belarusian: Берасьцейскае ваяводзтва, Polish: Województwo brzeskolitewskie) was a unit of administrative territorial division and a seat of local government (voivode) within the Grand Duchy of Lithuania (Polish–Lithuanian Commonwealth) since 1566 until the May Constitution in 1791, and from 1791 to 1795 (partitions of Poland) as a voivodeship in Poland. It was constituted from Brest-Litovsk and Pinsk counties.

Overview
It was created from southern part of Trakai Voivodeship in 1566. In 1791 Kobryn and Pinsk-Zarzeche (Its center was Poltnica, now Plotnitsa) counties were created. Pinsk-Zarzeche country was renamed as Zapynsky and its seat was moved to Stolin. After the Second Partition of Poland, in 1793, Pinsk and Zapynsky countries were left to Russian Empire as part of Minsk Governorate. Finally remainder of it was dissolved in 1795 and part of Slonim Governorate.

Zygmunt Gloger in his monumental book Historical Geography of the Lands of Old Poland provides this description of the Brest Litovsk Voivodeship:

“After the death of Yaroslav the Wise, the land located between the Bug, and the Dniepr were divided into several duchies. The Principality of Turov and Pinsk in the late 1310s joined the Grand Duchy of Lithuania (...) Kestutis, the son of the Grand Duke Gediminas, ruled western Lithuania, including Podlasie, Troki Voivodeship, and Polesie, together with Pinsk. During his reign, the three regions of Polesie - those of Brzesc, Pinsk and Turow were united. After the Union of Lublin, due to its immense area, Polesie was separated from Troki Voivodeship. Brzesc Voivodeship was created, in a shape which remained unchanged until the 1793 Second Partition of Poland. Central and eastern parts of the voivodeship were made of former Principality of Turov and Pinsk (...)

Brzesc Voivodeship was divided into two enormous counties - those of Brzesc and Pinsk.  Each county had its own starosta, electing two deputies to the Sejm, and two deputies to the Lithuanian Tribunal. The voivodeship had two senators, who were the Castellan and the Voivode (...) Among major cities were Brzesc, Pinsk, Biala Podlaska, Koden, Wolczyn and Kamieniec Litewski. In northeastern corner of Brzesc Voivodeship was Bialowieza Forest, where Polish kings hunted”.

Governors
Voivodeship Governor (Wojewoda) seat: 
 Brest-Litovsk

Voivodes:
 Jerzy Ilinicz (1566)
 Jerzy Tyszkiewicz Łohojski (1566-1576)
 Gabriel Hornostaj (1576-1587)
 Mikołaj Michał Sapieha (1587-1588)
 Jan Kiszka (1589—1592)
 Krzysztof Zenowicz (Zienowicz) (1592—1615)
 Jan Ostafi Tyszkiewicz Łohojski (1615-1631)
 Aleksander Ludwik Radziwiłł (1631–1635)
 Mikołaj Sapieha (XI 1638-VII 1642)
 Teofil Iwan Tryzna (1642—1644)
 Andrzej Massalski (1645-1651/1652)
 Jerzy Klonowski (1652—1653)
 Maksymilian Brzozowski (1653-1659)
 Kazimierz Ludwik Jewłaszewski (1659—1664)
 Jakub Teodor Kuncewicz (1664—1666/1667)
 Melchior Stanisław Sawicki (1666—1668)
 Krzysztof Piekarski (1668-1672)
 Stefan Kurcz (1672—1702)
 Krzysztof Komorowski (1702-1708)
 Władysław Jozafat Sapieha (1709-1733)
 Kazimierz Leon Sapieha (1735-1738)
 Adam Tadeusz Chodkiewicz (1738-1745)
 Jan Michał Sołłohub (1745-1748)
 Karol Józef Sapieha (1748-1768)
 Jan Antoni Horain (1768-1777)
 Mikołaj Tadeusz Łopaciński (1777—1778)
 Jan Tadeusz Zyberg (1783—1795)

References

 Słownik geograficzny Królestwa Polskiego i innych krajów słowiańskich, vol. I, pages 399-401
 Brest Litovsk Voivodeship, description by Zygmunt Gloger

 
Former voivodeships of Grand Duchy of Lithuania
Voivodeship
1566 establishments in Lithuania
1795 disestablishments in the Polish–Lithuanian Commonwealth
Early Modern history of Belarus